Kirpichli, formerly known as Kirpili, is a gas condensate field located in the Ahal Region of Turkmenistan.It is a source of natural gas. Surrounding villages are Modar and Sansy.

References 

Populated places in Ahal Region